In physics, a gravitational field is a model used to explain the influences that a massive body extends into the space around itself, producing a force on another massive body. Thus, a gravitational field is used to explain gravitational phenomena, and is measured in newtons per kilogram (N/kg).  Equivalently, it is measured in meters per second squared (m/s2).

In its original concept, gravity was a force between point masses. Following Isaac Newton, Pierre-Simon Laplace attempted to model gravity as some kind of radiation field or fluid, and since the 19th century, explanations for gravity have usually been taught in terms of a field model, rather than a point attraction.

In a field model, rather than two particles attracting each other, the particles distort spacetime via their mass, and this distortion is what is perceived and measured as a "force".    In such a model one states that matter moves in certain ways in response to the curvature of spacetime, and that there is either no gravitational force, or that gravity is a fictitious force.

Gravity is distinguished from other forces by its obedience to the equivalence principle.

Classical mechanics

In classical mechanics, a gravitational field is a physical quantity. A gravitational field can be defined using Newton's law of universal gravitation. Determined in this way, the gravitational field  around a single particle of mass  is a vector field consisting at every point of a vector pointing directly towards the particle. The magnitude of the field at every point is calculated by applying the universal law, and represents the force per unit mass on any object at that point in space. Because the force field is conservative, there is a scalar potential energy per unit mass, at each point in space associated with the force fields; this is called gravitational potential. The gravitational field equation is

This includes Newton's law of universal gravitation, and the relation between gravitational potential and field acceleration. The negative signs are inserted since the force acts antiparallel to the displacement. The equivalent field equation in terms of mass density  of the attracting mass is:

which contains Gauss's law for gravity, and Poisson's equation for gravity. Newton's law implies Gauss's law, but not vice versa; see Relation between Gauss's and Newton's laws.

These classical equations are differential equations of motion for a test particle in the presence of a gravitational field, i.e. setting up and solving these equations allows the motion of a test mass to be determined and described.

The field around multiple particles is simply the vector sum of the fields around each individual particle. An object in such a field will experience a force that equals the vector sum of the forces it would experience in these individual fields. This is mathematically

i.e. the gravitational field on mass  is the sum of all gravitational fields due to all other masses mi, except the mass  itself.

General relativity

In general relativity, the Christoffel symbols play the role of the gravitational force field and the metric tensor plays the role of the gravitational potential.

In general relativity, the gravitational field is determined by solving the Einstein field equations

These equations are dependent on the distribution of matter and energy in a region of space, unlike Newtonian gravity, which is dependent only on the distribution of matter.  The fields themselves in general relativity represent the curvature of spacetime.  General relativity states that being in a region of curved space is equivalent to accelerating up the gradient of the field.  By Newton's second law, this will cause an object to experience a fictitious force if it is held still with respect to the field.  This is why a person will feel himself pulled down by the force of gravity while standing still on the Earth's surface.  In general the gravitational fields predicted by general relativity differ in their effects only slightly from those predicted by classical mechanics, but there are a number of easily verifiable differences, one of the most well known being the deflection of light in such fields.

See also

 Classical mechanics
 Gravitation
 Gravitational potential
 Gravitational wave
 Newton's law of universal gravitation
 Newton's laws of motion
 Potential energy
 Speed of gravity
 Tests of general relativity
 Defining equation (physics)
 Entropic gravity

Notes

Theories of gravity
Gravity
Geodesy
General relativity